Zuzanna Szadkowski (born October 22, 1978) is a Polish-American actress known for her role as Dorota Kishlovsky on CW teen drama series Gossip Girl. Szadkowski also appeared on The Knick, Girls, Search Party, The Good Wife, Sopranos, and Guiding Light. She made her New York Stage debut in Nora Ephron and Delia Ephron's Love, Loss, and What I Wore in which she appeared in a record-breaking five all-star casts.

Early and personal life
Zuzanna Szadkowski was born on October 22, 1978, in Warsaw, Poland, and moved to the United States when she was three. About her national identity and Polish accent she displays in Gossip Girl, she said, "I was born in Poland, so I am able to identify with her that way. The accent is modeled after people in my own family, so hopefully I am doing it justice". Szadkowski and her family moved to Fort Wayne, Indiana, where she graduated from the R. Nelson Snider High School in 1997. She attended Barnard College of Columbia University, and went on to earn a Master of Fine Arts in acting from the Institute for Advanced Theater Training at Harvard University.

Szadkowski currently resides in Downtown Brooklyn. In 2010, she partnered with Sam Weisman to open an acting school, the Sam Weisman Studio, in New York City.

Career
Szadkowski made her acting debut in 2006, portraying two characters in Law & Order: Criminal Intent season 5 episode "Watch". She would reprise these roles in the season 7 episode "Lonelyville". In 2007, Szadkowski appeared in two episodes of The Sopranos, "Soprano Home Movies" and "Kennedy and Heidi". The same year, she was cast as Dorota Kishlovsky, the Polish maid of Blair Waldorf (Leighton Meester), in The CW series Gossip Girl. On April 20, 2009, The CW launched the Gossip Girl spin-off web series titled Gossip Girl: Chasing Dorota, consisting of six episodes.

Szadkowski also appeared as Nurse Pell on Steven Soderbergh's The Knick. She appeared in Girls, Search Party, The Good Wife, Elementary, and Guiding Light. Theatre credits include Uncle Romeo Vanya Juliet (WSJ Performance of the Year 2018); The Crucible; and Peter Pan with Bedlam; queens at LCT3; The Comedy of Errors as part of The Public Theater's Mobile Shakespeare Unit; King Philip's Head... with Clubbed Thumb; The 39 Steps at Actors Theatre of Louisville; The Merry Wives of Windsor at Two River Theater; and King Lear at Bristol Riverside Theatre. Szadkowski performed a one-woman show she also wrote as part of Bedlam's online theatre festival during the COVID-19 pandemic.

Filmography

Film

Television

Web

References

External links
 

1978 births
21st-century American actresses
21st-century Polish actresses
Actresses from New York City
Actresses from Warsaw
American film actresses
American stage actresses
American television actresses
Barnard College alumni
Living people
Polish emigrants to the United States
Polish film actresses
Polish stage actresses
Polish television actresses
Institute for Advanced Theater Training, Harvard University alumni